The 2021–22 Women's EHF European League was the 41st edition of EHF's second-tier women's handball competition, running from 16 October 2021 to 15 May 2022. 
Neptunes de Nantes were the defending champions.

Overview

Team allocation

Round and draw dates
The schedule of the competition was as follows (all draws were held at the EHF headquarters in Vienna, Austria).

Qualification stage

Round 2
There were 22 teams participating in round 2. 
The first legs were played on 16–17 October and the second legs were played on 23–24 October 2021.

|}
Notes

1 Both legs were hosted by Zagłębie Lubin.
2 Both legs were hosted by MKS Lublin.

Round 3
There were 24 teams participating in round 3. The first legs were played on 13–14 November and the second legs were played on 20–21 November 2021.

|}

Group stage 

The draw for the group phase was held on Thursday, 25 November 2021. In each group, teams played against each other in a double round-robin format, with home and away matches.

Group A

Group B

Group C

Group D

Quarterfinals

|}

Matches

Final four 
The final four was held at the Vibocold Arena in Viborg, Denmark on 14 and 15 May 2022. The draw was made on 7 April 2022.

Bracket

Semifinals

Third place game

Final

See also 
 2021–22 Women's EHF Champions League

Notes

References

External links
 Official website

Women's EHF Cup seasons
EHF European League Women
EHF European League Women